Harsh Mankad and Frederik Nielsen were the defending champions, but Nielsen chose not to compete this year.Mankad partnered up with Samuel Groth, but they lost in the semifinals against Brian Battistone and Nicholas Monroe.Battistone and Monroe won in the final 5–7, 6–3, [10–4] against Artem Sitak and Leonardo Tavares.

Seeds

Draw

Draw

References
 Main Draw
 Qualifying Draw

USTA LA Tennis Open - Doubles
USTA LA Tennis Open